Jacob Abbott House also known as Fewacres was a historic house in Farmington, Maine. It was built in 1819 and added to the National Register of Historic Places in 1983. It was the home of Jacob Abbott, author of children's books.

Edward Warren, art collector and author, lived here in the early 20th century.

References

Houses on the National Register of Historic Places in Maine
Farmington, Maine
Houses in Franklin County, Maine
Houses completed in 1819
National Register of Historic Places in Franklin County, Maine
Former National Register of Historic Places in Maine